Terence Joseph Willesee (born 27 April 1945) is an Australian retired journalist and television and radio presenter.

Personal life
Willesee is the son of the Don Willesee, a long-time member of the Australian Senate and Whitlam Government minister. He is the brother of the late Mike Willesee, who was also a journalist and television presenter.

Career

Willesee began his media career in Perth in 1969. He initially worked as a television news reporter before branching out into newsreading and producing documentaries. He produced and presented 14 prime time documentaries for STW TV station in Perth.

In 1981 Willesee was signed by the Seven Network to present a successful national current affairs program named Terry Willesee Tonight, based in Sydney. Terry was then signed by the Nine Network. Terry's role on the 7 current affairs show went to Derryn Hinch.

Terry Willesee hosted Live at Five on the Nine Network with Jo Pearson. He was also utilized by the network to host a variety of programs including Today and A Current Affair.

Willesee in 1992 moved to the United States where he anchored the nationally syndicated program, A Current Affair Extra. He also travelled the country as a reporter for A Current Affair (not related to Nine Network's programme of the same name). He was later promoted to anchor the Fox network's national  programme, A Current Affair Extra. He was probably the first Australian to host his own current affairs show on US television.

After three years in the United States he moved back to Australia, reading news for Nine Network affiliate STW in Perth. While in Perth he occasionally hosted a talkback radio show for 6PR.

In 2001, Willesee presented a talkback radio show for Sydney radio station 2GB.

In 2002, Terry returned to national television where he anchored Willesee Across Australia on Sky News Australia. He later presented First Edition in 2002 until June 2013 when he retired.

Willesee has also worked as a media trainer.

Awards
Logie Awards – Most Popular Male (Western Australia): 1978, 1979, 1980, 1981

References

External links
 

Australian television presenters
Living people
1945 births